Honda introduced several 200cc motorcycles with similar engines but different body variations in the 1980s. The model introduced in South Africa and Pakistan was known as the CD200 RoadMaster. The result was less power, a higher fuel economy and a lower top speed. The alternator system was also different from the CD185. Apart from this the models were quite similar, using the same frames, suspension, wheels, tyres, and brakes.

The CD200 featured a square speedometer, large front and rear mudguards, twin chrome exhausts, a choke tucked in behind the handle bars, a chrome plated fuel tank with the Honda logo and mock chrome air inlets on side panels. It had drum brakes in rear and front and a single 26 mm Keihin carburettor (PD 33A TA).

Other variations

Honda CD200 Benly – introduced in UK featuring 12 volt electrical system and capacitor discharge ignition (CDI)
Honda CM200 (Custom) – introduced in UK, European, and North American markets
The CM200T (also known as the Twinstar) was a twin cylinder motorcycle produced by Honda from 1980 to 1982 as part of its factory "Custom Motorcycle" lineup. The CM200's design was based on the CD200 Benly/Roadmaster, using the same engine, transmission, frame, and brakes. It had a speedometer that read up to 80 mph (130 km/h), with markings indicating the maximum speed for each gear ratio. Another instrument panel had lights for neutral, indicators and high beam, but no tachometer was provided.

The Twinstar used an odd combination of tire sizes (3.00-17 front and 3.50-16 rear) which can make branded replacement tires expensive, although Chinese tires are still available at reasonable prices.

Notes

References

CD200
Motorcycles introduced in 1980
Standard motorcycles
Motorcycles powered by straight-twin engines